Kalateh-ye Safdarabad (also Romanized as Kalāteh-ye Safdarābād) is a village in Titkanlu Rural District, Khabushan District, Faruj County, North Khorasan Province, Iran. At the 2006 census, its population was 717, in 182 families.

References 

Populated places in Faruj County